Großhofen is a town in the district of Gänserndorf in the Austrian state of Lower Austria.

Geography
Großhofen lies in the Weinviertel in Lower Austria. Only about 0.05 percent of the municipality is forested.

References

Cities and towns in Gänserndorf District